Community Board may refer to:

 Community boards in New Zealand, a level of local government
 Community Boards, a community based mediation program, established in 1976, in San Francisco, California, in the United States
 Community boards of New York City, 59 local representative bodies in New York City
 Community boards of the Bronx, 12 local representative bodies in The Bronx, New York City
 Community boards of Brooklyn, 18 local representative bodies in Brooklyn, New York City
 Community boards of Manhattan, 12 local representative bodies in Manhattan, New York City
 Community boards of Queens, 14 local representative bodies in Queens, New York City
 Community boards of Staten Island, 3 local representative bodies in Staten Island, New York City